= Eduard Nielsen =

Danish theologian (1923–2017)

Eduard Mikael V. Nielsen (8 May 1923 – 23 May 2017) was a Danish theologian.

He was a professor at the University of Copenhagen from 1956 to 1991. He was a fellow of the Norwegian Academy of Science and Letters from 1987.
